Maurice Desimpelaere (1920–2005) was a Belgian cyclist. He won the 1944 Paris–Roubaix and finished in fifth place in the 1945 Paris–Roubaix.

References

1920 births
2005 deaths
Belgian male cyclists
Cyclists from West Flanders
People from Ledegem